Norman Delva (born 15 July 1969) is a Guatemalan footballer. He competed in the men's tournament at the 1988 Summer Olympics.

References

External links
 

1969 births
Living people
Guatemalan footballers
Guatemala international footballers
Olympic footballers of Guatemala
Footballers at the 1988 Summer Olympics
Place of birth missing (living people)
Association football forwards